Eric J. Nestler is the Nash Family Professor of Neuroscience, Director of the Friedman Brain Institute, and Dean for Academic Affairs at the Icahn School of Medicine at Mount Sinai and Chief Scientific Officer of the Mount Sinai Health System. His research is focused on a molecular approach to drug addiction and depression.

He is the co-author of four books and more than 650 peer-reviewed articles, and he serves as principal investigator on 6 NIH grants.

Biography

Education
Nestler is a graduate of Herricks High School in New Hyde Park, New York. He received his B.A., his Ph.D. and his M.D. from Yale University, where he performed his doctoral research in the laboratory of Paul Greengard. He completed his residency in psychiatry at both McLean Hospital in Massachusetts and Yale in 1987.

Career
Nestler served as Director of the Abraham Ribicoff Research Facilities, as the Founding Director of the Division of Molecular Psychiatry at Yale until 2000, and as Chairman of the Department of Psychiatry at the University of Texas Southwestern Medical Center at Dallas. He joined Mount Sinai in 2008. He has served on the Boards of Scientific Counselors of the National Institute on Drug Abuse and of the National Institute on Alcohol Abuse and Alcoholism, on the National Advisory Mental Health Council for the National Institute of Mental Health, the National Advisory Drug Abuse Council for the National Institute on Drug Abuse, as Council Member of the American College of Neuropsychopharmacology (for which he served as president in 2011) and the Society for Neuroscience (for which he served as president in 2017). He is a member of the Scientific Advisory Board of the Brain & Behavior Research Foundation (BBRF, previously NARSAD) and of One Mind (previously International Mental Health Research Organization), as well as a past member of the Board of Directors of the McKnight Endowment Fund in Neuroscience. He was elected to the Institute of Medicine (now National Academy of Medicine) in 1998 and the American Academy of Arts and Sciences in 2005.

Research 
The Nestler laboratory's focus in neuropsychopharmacology and molecular neuroscience concentrates on forming a molecular approach to psychiatry and furthering the understanding of the molecular basis of both depression and drug addiction, using animal models to study the way drug use or stress affects the brain. His addiction research largely centers around several transcription factors, including ΔFosB and CREB (master control proteins that induce addiction or depression in vulnerable individuals or resistance to these syndromes in resilient individuals) and the associated epigenetic remodeling that occurs in specific neuronal or glial cell types in the brain. A major goal is to identify the ‘chromatin scars’—long lasting epigenetic changes at specific genomic loci—that mediate lifelong changes in disease vulnerability. Among the prominent targets of this work are medium spiny neurons of the nucleus accumbens and pyramidal neurons in prefrontal cortex and ventral hippocampus. The Nestler laboratory has driven innovative use of viral-mediated gene transfer, inducible, cell-type specific mutations in mice, and locus-specific epigenome editing to establish causal links between molecular and behavioral phenomena in animal models. The laboratory also makes creative use of advanced machine learning approaches to derive novel biological insight from large sequencing datasets.

Awards
Dr. Nestler's awards and honors include the Pfizer Scholars Award (1987), the Sloan Research Fellowship (1987), the McKnight Scholar Award (1989), the Jordi-Folch-Pi Memorial Award from the American Society of Neurochemistry (1990), the Efron Award of the American College of Neuropsychopharmacology (1994), the Pasarow Foundation Award for Neuropsychiatric Research (1998), the NARSAD Distinguished Investigator Award (1996), the Bristol-Myers Squibb Freedom to Discover Neuroscience Research Grant (2004), the Patricia S. Goldman-Rakic Award and the Falcone Prize both from NARSAD (2008, 2009), and the Rhoda and Bernard Sarnat International Prize in Mental Health from the Institute of Medicine (2010). He received an honorary doctorate from Uppsala University in Sweden in 2011, and the Anna Monika Prize in Depression Research (2012).

In 2017, he was awarded the Wilbur Cross Medal by Yale University for distinguished alumnus from the graduate school, and the Paul Hoch Distinguished Service Award from the American College of Neuropsychopharmacology. In 2019, he received the Redelsheimer Distinguished Award in Biological Psychiatry from the Society for Biological Psychiatry. In 2020, Dr. Nestler received an honorary degree from Concordia University in Montreal as “a pioneer in depression and drug-addiction research and institutional advocacy for equity, diversity and inclusion.

NIH-Funded Grants and Research

Publications (partial list)

Books 
Nestler is the author (with Dennis S. Charney, Pamela Sklar and Joseph D. Buxbaum) of Neurobiology of Mental Illness (5th edition), of Nestler, Hyman and Malenka’s Molecular Neuropharmacology (with Paul J. Kenny, Scott J. Russo and Anne Schaefer); 4th edition) and two additional books published earlier: Protein Phosphorylation in the Nervous System (with Paul Greengard) and Molecular Foundations of Psychiatry (with Steven E. Hyman). He is also the author of more than 650 peer-reviewed publications and reviews. He directs six research projects funded by the National Institute on Drug Abuse and the National Institute of Mental Health. He also serves as director of the Depression Task Force of the Hope for Depression Research Foundation.

Articles 
Nestler has been cited more than 134,000 times and has an H-index of 188.

References

External links
Nestler Lab at the Icahn School of Medicine

American medical academics
American neuroscientists
Living people
Members of the National Academy of Medicine
Icahn School of Medicine at Mount Sinai faculty
Yale University alumni
University of Texas Southwestern Medical Center alumni
People from New Hyde Park, New York
Writers on addiction
Scientists from New York (state)
McLean Hospital people
Year of birth missing (living people)
American pharmacologists
American textbook writers
Herricks High School alumni